A National Cultural Ecosystem Conservation Area (NCECA) is a specific area designated by the Ministry of Culture and Tourism of the People's Republic of China.  Created to holistically protecting cultural patterns that are historically and culturally rich, in good state of existence and have important values and distinctive features, its core function is to preserve the intangible cultural heritage in China.

Seven out of twenty-three conservation areas were formally declared by the Ministry on December 25, 2019.  The rest of them are technically called "experiment areas".  A formal designation as "National Cultural Ecosystem Conservation Area" will only be granted upon completion of the project, subject to inspection and acceptance by the Ministry.

List of National Cultural Ecosystem Conservation Areas
Southern Fujian Cultural Ecosystem Conservation Area (Fujian)
Huizhou Cultural Ecosystem Conservation Area (Anhui, Jiangxi)
Rebgong Cultural Ecosystem Conservation Area (Qinghai)
Qiang Cultural Ecosystem Conservation Area (Sichuan, Shaanxi)
Wuling Mountains Region (Xiangxi) Tujia and Miao Cultural Ecosystem Conservation Area (Hunan)
Marine Fishing Culture (Xiangshan) Eco-Conservation Area (Zhejiang)
Qilu Culture (Weifang) Eco-Conservation Area (Shandong) (Qilu: an alternative name for Shandong Province)

List of National Cultural Ecosystem Conservation Experimental Areas
Hakka Culture (Meizhou) Eco-Conservation Experimental Area (Guangdong)
Central Shanxi Cultural Ecosystem Conservation Experimental Area (Shanxi)
Dêqên Ethno-Cultural Ecosystems Conservation Experimental Area (Yunnan)
Dali Cultural Ecosystem Conservation Experimental Area (Yunnan)
Northern Shaanxi Cultural Ecosystem Conservation Experimental Area (Shaanxi)
Hakka Culture (Southern Jiangxi) Eco-Conservation Experimental Area (Jiangxi)
Bronze Drum Culture (Hechi) Eco-Conservation Experimental Area (Guangxi)
Qiandongnan Ethno-Cultural Ecosystems Conservation Experimental Area (Guizhou)
Gêsar Culture (Golog) Eco-Conservation Experimental Area (Qinghai)
Wuling Mountains Region (Southwestern Hubei) Tujia and Miao Cultural Ecosystem Conservation Experimental Area (Hubei)
Wuling Mountains Region (Southeastern Chongqing) Tujia and Miao Cultural Ecosystem Conservation Experimental Area (Chongqing)
Hakka Culture (Western Fujian) Eco-Conservation Experimental Area (Fujian)
Storytelling and Ballad Singing Culture (Baofeng) Eco-Conservation Experimental Area (Henan) 
Tibetan Culture (Yushu) Eco-Conservation Experimental Area (Qinghai)
Heluo Culture Eco-Conservation Experimental Area (Henan)
Jingdezhen Ceramic Culture Eco-Conservation Experimental Area (Jiangxi)

See also
List of protected areas of China

Protected areas of China